The 117th New York State Legislature, consisting of the New York State Senate and the New York State Assembly, met from January 2 to April 27, 1894, during the third year of Roswell P. Flower's governorship, in Albany.

Background
Under the provisions of the New York Constitution of 1846, 32 Senators and 128 assemblymen were elected in single-seat districts; senators for a two-year term, assemblymen for a one-year term. On April 26, 1892, the Legislature re-apportioned the Senate Districts and the number of assemblymen per county. The senatorial districts were made up of entire counties, except New York County (nine districts), Kings County (five districts) and Erie County (two districts). The Assembly districts were made up of entire towns, or city wards, forming a contiguous area, all within the same county.

On January 27, 1893, the Legislature passed "An Act to amend chapter 398, of the Laws of 1892, entitled 'An Act to provide for a convention to revise and amend the Constitution'", calling a Constitutional Convention to meet in 1894.

At this time there were two major political parties: the Democratic Party and the Republican Party. The Prohibition Party, the Socialist Labor Party and a "People's Party" also nominated tickets.

Elections
The New York state election, 1893 was held on November 7. All six statewide elective offices up for election were carried by the Republicans. The approximate party strength at this election, as expressed by the vote for Secretary of State, was: Republican 545,000; Democratic 521,000; Prohibition 34,000; Socialist Labor 20,000; and People's Party 17,000.

Also elected were 175 delegates to the Constitutional Convention; five delegates in each senatorial district, and 15 delegates-at-large elected statewide.

This was the only election of State Senators under the apportionment of 1892.

Sessions
The Legislature met for the regular session at the State Capitol in Albany on January 2, 1894; and adjourned on April 27.

George R. Malby (R) was elected Speaker.

Charles T. Saxton (R) was elected president pro tempore of the State Senate.

The Constitutional Convention met at the State Capitol in Albany on May 8; and adjourned on September 29. Joseph H. Choate (R) was elected president; and Thomas G. Alvord (R) First Vice President.

The new Constitution increased the number of state senators from 32 to 50, and the number of assemblymen from 128 to 150; and re-apportioned the Senate districts, and the number of assemblymen per county. Broome, Cattaraugus, Cayuga, Chautauqua, Jefferson, Monroe, Niagara, Oneida, Onondaga, Oswego, St. Lawrence and Suffolk counties gained one seat each; Erie County gained two; Kings County three; and New York County five. The new Constitution also shortened the governor's and lieutenant governor's term to two years; and moved the election of state officers and state senators from odd-numbered to even-numbered years.

The new Constitution was submitted to the voters at the New York state election, 1894, and was adopted.

State Senate

Districts

Note: There are now 62 counties in the State of New York. The counties which are not mentioned in this list had not yet been established, or sufficiently organized, the area being included in one or more of the abovementioned counties.

Members
The asterisk (*) denotes members of the previous Legislature who continued in office as members of this Legislature. Timothy D. Sullivan, Frank A. O'Donnel, Joseph C. Wolff, Thomas C. O'Sullivan and Jacob Rice changed from the Assembly to the Senate.

Employees
 Clerk: John S. Kenyon
 Sergeant-at-Arms: Charles V. Schram
 Doorkeeper: Edward Dowling
 Stenographer: Lucius A. Waldo

State Assembly

Assemblymen
The asterisk (*) denotes members of the previous Legislature who continued as members of this Legislature.

Note: For brevity, the chairmanships omit the words "...the Committee on (the)..."

Employees
 Clerk: George W. Dunn
 Assistant Clerk: Haines D. Cunningham
Financial Clerk: William C. Stevens
 Sergeant-at-Arms: James H. Manville
 Doorkeeper: Joseph Bauer
 Stenographer: Henry F. Gilson

Notes

Sources
New York State Legislative Souvenir for 1894 with Portraits of the Members of Both Houses by Henry P. Phelps
The New York Red Book compiled by Edgar L. Murlin (published by James B. Lyon, Albany NY, 1897; see pg. 385 for senate districts; pg. 404 for senators; pg. 410–417 for Assembly districts; and pg. 510f for assemblymen)
LEGISLATURE REPUBLICAN in NYT on November 9, 1893
THE LEGISLATURE AT WORK in NYT on January 3, 1894
FINAL PROTEST BY SHEEHAN in NYT on February 7, 1894
THE WORK OF M'KANE UNDONE in NYT on February 22, 1894
McGUIRE AND HUGHES MUST GO in NYT on April 4, 1894
LEGISLATURE'S WORK IS DONE and RECORD OF THE LEGISLATURE in NYT on April 28, 1894

117
1894 in New York (state)
1894 U.S. legislative sessions